Carabus aba is a species of ground beetle in the large genus Carabus.

References

Beetles described in 2002
aba